Cédric Matéta Nkomi (born in Creil, Oise, France on 30 January 1992) better known by the stage name KeBlack is a French rapper and singer of Congolese origin. He is signed to the Bomayé Musik label.

Keblack displayed interested in music at the age of 15. His older brother was already a well-known rapper, and thus Nkomi was encouraged to pursue a musical education. He was influenced the most by the group MGS. Youssoupha and his record label Bomayé Musik (part of Universal Music) signed him with his release "J'ai déconné", which became a hit in 2015. He became more famous with the certified diamond "Bazardée" which garnered 180 million views on YouTube. Encouraged by its success, he launched a new musical project, the album Premier étage, released on 27 January 2017. The album was certified gold. The follow-up album Appartement 105 was released on 11 May 2018.

Discography

Albums

Singles

*Did not appear in the official Belgian Ultratop 50 charts, but rather in the bubbling under Ultratip charts.

Other charting songs

*Did not appear in the official Belgian Ultratop 50 charts, but rather in the bubbling under Ultratip charts.

Featured in

*Did not appear in the official Belgian Ultratop 50 charts, but rather in the bubbling under Ultratip charts.

References

External links
Facebook

French rappers
1992 births
Living people
People from Creil
French people of Democratic Republic of the Congo descent